Qazaqi (also Romanized as Qazāqī, Qazāghī, and Kazogī) is a village in Milanlu Rural District, in the Central District of Esfarayen County, North Khorasan Province, Iran. At the 2006 census, its population was 329, in 68 families.

References 

Populated places in Esfarayen County